Bangladesh Sadharon Chhatra Odhikar Songrokkhon Parishad (English: Bangladesh General Students' Right Protection Council), commonly known BSRC is a Bangladeshi democratic student organization to promote and protect general students' right, to reform quotas and eliminate all types of discriminations in the recruitment of government employees. The organization first came to prominence in 2018 for leading Bangladesh quota reform movement. Due to the movement's increasing popularity, Bangladesh government accepted its five-point demands and abolished quotas in the recruitment of Bangladesh Civil Service cadres though no reform was announced in the recruitment of lower grade officers. In July 2018, many involved in the demonstrations of the organization were brutally attacked. In July 2018, the embassies of Germany, USA, Norway, Switzerland and few other countries in Dhaka expressed their concern over the 'brutal attacks' on peaceful demonstration of Bangladesh Sadharon Chhatra Odhikar Songrokkhon Parishad. For 2019 DUCSU election, the organization announced its panel on 25 February 2019. The organization made Nurul Haq Nur vice-president candidate of the panel and Muhammad Rashed Khan general secretary contender and Faruk Hasan assistant general secretary nominee.

References 

Student organisations in Bangladesh